The Swedish motorcycle Grand Prix was a motorcycling event that was part of the Grand Prix motorcycle racing season in various stints from 1958 to 1990.

Formerly used circuits

Official names and sponsors
1971–1972: Sveriges Grand Prix för motorcyklar (no official sponsor)
1973–1974, 1976–1977, 1981–1989: Swedish TT (no official sponsor)
1975: Pommac Swedish TT
1978: Sveriges Grand Prix (no official sponsor)
1979: Grand Prix of Sweden (no official sponsor)
1990: Nordic TT (no official sponsor)

Winners of the Swedish motorcycle Grand Prix

Multiple winners (riders)

Multiple winners (manufacturers)

By year

References

 

 
Recurring sporting events established in 1958
Recurring sporting events disestablished in 1990
1958 establishments in Sweden
1990 disestablishments in Sweden